Baba Gurditta (5 November 1613–15 March 1638,  Gurmukhi:  ਗੁਰਦਿੱਤਾ) was the son of Guru Hargobind (sixth Sikh guru), and the father of Guru Har Rai (seventh Sikh guru) of Sikhism. There is a gurudwara in Kiratpur Sahib, Punjab which is in remembrance of Baba Gurditta.

Biography 
During the years of 1626–1627, he lived in Kartarpur in the Jalandhar district as per directions by his father. He was the founder of Kiratpur near the Shivalik foothills, also according to commands by his father. He took part in the Battle of Kartarpur (1635) against Painde Khan. When a Sikh, named Nakhora, offered his daughter to be wed to Baba Gurditta, Mata Ananti protested against this idea and complained to Guru Hargobind. Afterwards, the Guru disapproved of the match and the daughter of Nakhora returned home unwed to Gurditta.

Baba Gurditta died around 1638, while his father was still alive. His brother Guru Tegh Bahadur would later become the ninth Sikh guru when Baba Gurdita's line of succession dried up. After the Battle of Kartarpur, he took rest under a Banyan tree which is still there in Kartarpur near Sukka Talab he tied his horses under the tree. The sacred Banyan tree has great significance for the Sikhs of Kartarpur. The site is maintained by the Toor clan.

Then Baba Gurditta followed the path 5 km north of Kartarpur and conducted the funeral of martyred Nihangs and where now stands a gurdwara called Killi Sahib.

Head of Udasi sect 

He was appointed by the aged Sri Chand to succeed him as the head of the Udasi sect that he had established. He is remembered for giving new strength and energy towards the missionary activities of the sect, such as by establishing four Udasi preaching centres known as dhūāṅs.

Death 
According to legend, on the earlier part of the day of 15 March 1638 in Kiratpur, Baba Gurditta performed a miracle reluctantly under duress where he revived a cow which he, or another member of his hunting party, had accidentally shot and killed after mistaking it for a deer while he was out hunting. Guru Hargobind later admonished him for performing a miracle. Baba Gurditta was deeply affected by this reprimand by his father and silently retired himself to a secluded place outside of Kiratpur, near the shrine of Budhan Shah, where he died later the same day. The Guru searched for him and discovered his dead body, which brought upon much sadness to Hargobind and the Sikh congregation. These events may have had a strong impression on the young Tyag Mal (later Guru Tegh Bahadur), teaching him a lesson on the transience and impermanence of life. On the spot of his death now stands a dehrā (mausoleum). Another account of his death states that he died while wearing bridge-groom robes after his requested marriage to the daughter of Nakhora was rejected by his father. He was succeeded as head of the Udasi sect by four of his disciples, them namely being Almast, Balu Hasne, Phul, and Goinde.

Gallery

See also
Gurudwara Baba Gurditta

References

External links
   www.babagurdittaji.com 

Punjabi people
Family members of the Sikh gurus
1613 births
1638 deaths